Mae or MAE may refer to:

Aviation
 Mali Air Express, an airline
MAE, Madera Municipal Airport, California, United States

Finance
 Material adverse effect, in finance
 Maximum adverse excursion, the largest loss suffered by a single financial trade while it is open
 Mercado Abierto Electrónico, an Argentinian stock exchange

Government departments
 Ministry of Europe and Foreign Affairs, France
 Ministry of Foreign Affairs (Italy)
 Ministry of Foreign Affairs (Luxembourg)
 Ministry of Foreign Affairs (Romania) )

Music
Mae (band), American rock band
"Mae" (Riz Ortolani song), a 1965 song by Riz Ortolani
Meridian Arts Ensemble
"Mae", a 2012 song by The Gaslight Anthem from the album Handwritten
"Mae", a 1965 single by Herb Alpert that appeared on the album Going Places

People
Mae (given name)
Mae (surname)

Places
 Mae, Washington, a community in the United States
Maè, a river in Italy
MAE, Madera Municipal Airport, California, United States

Science and technology
Macintosh Application Environment, emulation software for Unix
 Materials Adherence Experiment, a material science experiment conducted during NASA's Mars Pathfinder mission
 Mean absolute error, a measure of statistical deviation
 MAE-East or MAE-West, two of the first Internet Exchange Points
 Motion aftereffect, visual illusion

Other uses
 Mae language, spoken in Vanuatu
 Member of the Academia Europaea, a European award